Scott Wike Lucas (February 19, 1892 – February 22, 1968) was an American attorney and politician. A member of the Democratic Party, he represented Illinois in the U.S. House of Representatives (1935–1939) and the U.S. Senate (1939–1951). He was the Senate Majority Leader from 1949 to 1951.

Early life
Lucas was born on a tenant farm near Chandlerville, in Cass County, Illinois. He was the youngest of six children of William Douglas and Sarah Catherine (née Underbrink) Lucas. His parents named him after Scott Wike, a Democrat who served as a representative from Illinois (1875–1877, 1889–1893). His nephew was Allen T. Lucas who practiced law with Lucas and who served in the Illinois General Assembly. After attending public schools, he began his studies at Illinois Wesleyan University. During college, he was active in athletics. He lettered in football, basketball, and baseball and played semiprofessional baseball in the Three-I League during his summer breaks.

Lucas graduated from Wesleyan with a law degree in 1914 and was admitted to the bar the following year. He served as a schoolteacher before entering private practice in Havana. During World War I, he served in the US Army and rose to become a lieutenant.

Lucas returned to his law practice following his military service and served as a state's attorney for Mason County from 1920 to 1925. He also worked as a commander of the Illinois Department of the American Legion. In 1932, he was defeated by William H. Dieterich for the Democratic nomination to challenge Republican incumbent Otis F. Glenn for a United States Senate seat from Illinois.

Lucas was later appointed chairman of State Tax Commission by Governor Henry Horner, serving from 1933 to 1935.

House
In 1934, following the death of Speaker of the House Henry Thomas Rainey, Lucas was elected to the House of Representatives from Illinois's 20th congressional district. He established himself as a strong supporter of Franklin D. Roosevelt's New Deal, working to pass the Soil Conservation and Domestic Allotment Act of 1936 and the Agricultural Adjustment Act of 1938. However, Lucas disagreed with Roosevelt over the president's court-packing plan, which Lucas denounced as "useless, selfish, and futile."

Senate
In 1938, after William Dieterich declined to run for re-election, Lucas was elected to the U.S. Senate over Republican Richard J. Lyons, with a 51%–48% victory. He was re-elected in 1944. Lucas was a favorite son candidate and among twelve nominated at the 1944 Democratic National Convention to serve as Franklin D. Roosevelt's running mate in the presidential election that year. With support from Harry S. Truman, he was elected party whip in 1946. Lucas, a moderate, drew support from both conservative and liberal wings of the party. He took over the Midwest campaign for Truman and was credited with assisting Truman's 1948 re-election and bringing nine Democrats into the Senate. When Alben Barkley became vice-president and resigned his seat, Lucas became majority leader. However, he was unable to build a consensus as Senate Majority Leader with the onset of the anticommunist era, and lost in 1950, to Republican Everett Dirksen. Lucas had become a target of Republican wrath with loss of political power in the Senate and the White House. His 1950 reelection campaign featured the active intervention into Illinois politics of Wisconsin Senator Joseph McCarthy, who traveled the state with Dirksen saying that Senator Lucas was "soft on communism." Dirksen would go on to decisively defeat Lucas with a 54% to 46% victory. Privately, in later years, Dirksen attributed his victory to Lucas's responsibilities as Senate Majority Leader, at the apparent expense of his state; Dirksen was free to campaign locally, often debating Lucas's Illinois Democratic Party proxies and calling attention to Lucas's prolonged absence from the state.

Policy positions
Overall, as Congressman and Senator Scott Lucas focused on civil rights, labor unions, foreign policy, and agriculture.  He supported anti-lynching legislation, opposed the poll tax, and was a vocal advocate for desegregation. He played a major role in the passage of the Fair Labor Standards Act in 1938. It established a federal minimum wage and maximum hours, and required overtime pay under specified conditions. He supported Franklin Roosevelt's main foreign policy initiatives, including Lend-Lease in 1941 for military aid to the Allies, and the creation of the United Nations.  He supported the New Deal farm programs, which were popular in rural Illinois, especially the Agricultural Adjustment Act of 1938.  As As Majority Leader of the Senate in 1949-1950 he supported Harry Truman's domestic and foreign agenda.

References

Further reading

 Deason, Brian. "Scott Lucas, Everett Dirksen, and the 1950 Senate Election in Illinois." Journal of the Illinois State Historical Society 95.1 (2002): 33-51. online

  Deason, Brian Scot.   "Eye of the storm: A political biography of United States Senator Scott W. Lucas of Illinois" (PhD dissertation, Southern Illinois University at Carbondale; ProQuest Dissertations Publishing, 2001. 3021509).

 Schapsmeier, Edward L., and Frederick H. Schapsmeier. "Scott W. Lucas of Havana: His Rise and Fall as Majority Leader in the United States Senate." Journal of the Illinois State Historical Society 70.4 (1977): 302-320. online

External links

 

|-

|-

|-

|-

|-

|-

|-

1892 births
1968 deaths
20th-century American politicians
Democratic Party members of the United States House of Representatives from Illinois
Democratic Party United States senators from Illinois
Illinois Wesleyan Titans baseball players
Illinois Wesleyan Titans football players
Illinois Wesleyan Titans men's basketball players
People from Cass County, Illinois
1944 United States vice-presidential candidates
American men's basketball players
Military personnel from Illinois
Players of American football from Illinois
Baseball players from Illinois
Basketball players from Illinois
Schoolteachers from Illinois